Melvin Vernell III (July 25, 1992 – June 7, 2012), better known by his stage name Lil Phat, was an American rapper. Born in Baton Rouge, Louisiana, Vernell began rapping as a teenager and was signed to Trill Entertainment in 2007 when he was 14 years old. He is best known for his contribution to the single "Independent" by Webbie. He made a number of guest appearances on Trill Entertainment releases before being killed at the age of 19.

Death

On June 7, 2012, Vernell was shot and killed outside Northside Hospital in Sandy Springs, Georgia, where he was awaiting his daughter's birth. Two suspects were spotted fleeing the scene, according to witnesses. Three men were convicted of the murder in August 2014. Related charges concerning a fourth defendant, Mani Chulpayev, were dropped.

Discography

Album Appearances

See also
 List of murdered hip hop musicians

References

External links
 

1992 births
2012 deaths
Rappers from Texas
Rappers from New Orleans
African-American male rappers
People from Waco, Texas
2012 murders in the United States
Murdered African-American people
People murdered by organized crime
American murder victims
Deaths by firearm in Georgia (U.S. state)
People murdered in Georgia (U.S. state)
Southern hip hop musicians
21st-century African-American people